VV Rijsoord is a football club from Rijsoord, Netherlands. In 2020–21 it plays in the Hoofdklasse.

History
In 1990 the Rijsoord women won the national championship soccer.

The male squad participated in the national KNVB Cup in 2007–2008. It relegated from Hoofdklasse to the Eerste Klasse in 2018, immediately securing a section championship and bouncing back to the Hoofdklasse. In 2020 it started its first consecutive season in the Hoofdklasse.

Associated people 
Hesterine de Reus – player and coach

References

External links
 Official site

Football clubs in the Netherlands
Football clubs in Ridderkerk
Association football clubs established in 1924
1924 establishments in the Netherlands